Boys Beware is a 1961 dramatic short social guidance propaganda film released through Sid Davis Productions. It portrays and attempts to educate about an alleged danger to young boys from predatory homosexuals. The film was released under the copyright laws in the United States at the time of its release, but has lapsed into the public domain and is available from the Prelinger Archives.

Summary

The film, shot partially in the Los Angeles suburb of Inglewood, California, and produced with the cooperation of the city's police department and the Inglewood Unified School District, is narrated by a police detective on his way to a school meeting to discuss the issue of sexual predators who attempt to lure young adolescent males.

Aside from the film's early 1960s-culturally influenced conclusion that homosexual men are inherently dangerous to young boys, the film has been noted for its unusual perception of police procedure: the first boy, named Jimmy Barnes, was supposedly playing a game of ball and did not feel like walking home, so he decided to "thumb" a ride. A few moments later, a car pulls up and Jimmy enters the stranger's car. Jimmy and the stranger start a conversation while on the way to Jimmy's house. They arrive at his house and Jimmy gets out of the stranger's car. The following day, the stranger was in his car waiting for him. Jimmy noticed that it was the same car and decided to ride once again. Instead of going straight to Jimmy's house, they went to a drive-in and the stranger bought him a Coke. The scene after shows ducks in a pond, and then switches to Jimmy and the stranger fishing together on a dock. Jimmy and the stranger (Ralph) reveal their names when they pull out their lunch. Jimmy then eats a sandwich, while Ralph pulls out a deck of "pornographic pictures." Later, Jimmy is taken to a hotel with Ralph, presumably to be molested, and later reports the crime. The perpetrator is arrested; the victim is put on probation.

Another incautious, unsuspecting boy, Mike, is seen playing a game of basketball with a group of friends while ignoring a man watching them. The group decides to leave, but Mike decides to stay and practice. The man then joins Mike, which is better than playing alone, according to Mike. Mike then decides to leave, and the stranger offers him a ride home. Mike accepts the offer, and enters the vehicle. Mike is supposedly killed that night, having "traded his life for a newspaper headline".

A third boy, Denny, is tricked into entering a man's car while he and his friend were sorting out newspapers. The car leaves, and the friend writes down the licence plate number. Denny's friend is later delivering papers and talks to Denny's mother, who is seen watering her lawn. Denny's mother decides to go inside and call the police. Right after Denny's mother called the police, the car is quickly spotted, and the stranger is arrested.

A fourth boy is Bobby, who was in a beachside restroom where he and his friends were changing. Bobby's friends decide to head for home together, while Bobby decides to take a "shortcut" under a pier. As Bobby is walking to the shortcut, he notices that a man, who was seen at the restroom, was following him. Bobby then waves to his friends, and runs to join them.

The film equates homosexuals with child molesters and hebephiles, repeatedly describing homosexuality as a mental illness. True to the stereotypes of its time, the gay men in the film have mustaches, sunglasses and/or bow ties.

The film has other odd moments, probably the result of its $1,000 budget—a minuscule sum for a short film, even in 1961. Most notably, in the third scenario, the stranger is seen driving the same car (a 1959 Chevrolet Biscayne) as the detective.

Davis was friendly with the police in Southern California and would accept their suggestions of topics to make films about, allowing them to guide the films' message and development.

A full-color version of the film was made in 1973, titled Boys Aware, using the same script and soundtrack with different actors. A third edition of the film was produced in 1979.

Reception
In 1965 Attorney General of Florida Richard Gerstein recommended that high schools in Dade County, Florida show the film to prevent homosexuality.

Margalit Fox of The New York Times said in 2006 that the film was one of several of Sid Davis's films that "aged badly".

In 2015, a Missouri high school teacher at Raymore-Peculiar High School was suspended after showing Boys Beware to his students. He stated that he wanted to show what attitudes towards gay people had been like in previous eras.

The film was played through and mocked on the November 28, 2005 episode of The Opie & Anthony Show, and became an occasional object of ridicule on the show thereafter.

A clip of the film was mocked in season 19 of the sitcom Family Guy. 

Charles Ferruzza of The Pitch stated that "the situations in the film were pretty far-fetched by 1972 standards — though not as ridiculous as those in Marijuana".

Film versions

See also
 List of American films of 1961
Perversion for Profit
List of films in the public domain in the United States

References

External links

 - Original
 - Colorized
 - Remake
Boys beware. Sundance Channel. June 11, 2009.

1961 documentary films
1961 films
American LGBT-related films
American social guidance and drug education films
Homophobia
Articles containing video clips
1961 in LGBT history
1961 LGBT-related films
1960s English-language films
LGBT-related controversies in film
1960s American films
Films directed by Sid Davis